The University of Pretoria is a public university in Pretoria,
the administrative and de facto capital of South Africa. The university in its more than a century of academic service has delivered more than 200,000 alumni. Below is a list of prominent alumni.

Authors and academics
Prof Tshilidzi Marwala: academic, engineer
Paul Moorcraft: author, BBC commentator
Prof Pierre de Villiers Pienaar: author and pioneer of speech therapy in South Africa
Prof Calie Pistorius: Vice-Chancellor of the University of Pretoria, 2001–2009
Prof Saurabh Sinha: academic, engineer, author and executive dean
Stefan Swanepoel: New York Times best-selling author, public speaker
Prof Bettine van Vuuren, zoologist

Arts and entertainment

Jana Cilliers: actress
Bettie Cilliers-Barnard: fine artist
Dr Mimi Coertse: opera singer
Ampie du Preez: actor
Tsakane Valentine Maswanganyi
Focalistic: South African Rapper and Amapiano artist 
Sandra Prinsloo: actress
Amanda Strydom: actress
Brümilda van Rensburg: actress
Verna Vels: voice artist, television director
Carrol Boyes: artist and businesswoman

Sport personalities

Springbok captains:
Naas Botha
Wynand Claassen
Victor Matfield
Joost van der Westhuizen

Other Springboks:
Gary Botha
Fanie de Villiers
Ernst Dinkelmann
Heyneke Meyer
Wynand Olivier
Danie Rossouw
Pierre Spies

Business leaders and entrepreneurs
Dr Willem Barnard: CEO, KWV
Laurie Dippenaar: FirstRand Bank Chairman
Dr Marius Kloppers: international CEO of global mining giant BHP Billitoni
Daniel Snzile Ndima, biotechnology entrepreneur
Dr Anton Rupert: billionaire, former UP Chancellor and Tukkie of the Century
Dr Chris Stals: business leader; former UP Chancellor
Giam Swiegers: CEO of Deloitte Australia
Elon Musk, a founder, CEO or both of all of: PayPal, SpaceX, Tesla, OpenAI, The Boring Company and Neuralink.

Law
Geraldine Fraser-Moleketi: former Minister of Public Service and Administration
Prof Christof Heyns: United Nations Human Rights Council; Special Rapporteur on extrajudicial, summary or arbitrary executions
Judge Johann Kriegler
Frans Lourens Herman Rumpff, Chief Justice of South Africa
Judge Johann van der Westhuizen: Constitution Court
Prof. Kithure A. Kindiki

Health and medicine

Dr Sindisiwe van Zyl, physician, radio DJ, columnist, health activist and researcher
Prof Flavia Senkubuge, physician, professor of public health medicine, past President of the Colleges of Medicine of South Africa

Theologians, welfare, psychology
Michael Licona
Archbishop Desmond Tutu: social rights activist; winner of Nobel Peace Prize

Others
Etienne de Villiers: Executive Chairperson and President, ATP Tennis
Elizabeth Voigt: late director of the McGregor Museum, Kimberley
Naledi Chirwa: EFF Member of Parliament
Shudufhadzo Musida: Miss South Africa 2020
Lalela Mswane: Miss South Africa 2021 & Miss Supranational 2022
Ndavi Nokeri: Miss South Africa 2022

References

 
Pretoria
University